Vindhya is an Indian politician and actress who appeared in Tamil language films. She currently serves as deputy propaganda secretary in All India Anna Dravida Munnetra Kazhagam. She appeared in notable productions including Sangamam (1999), alongside Rahman.

Early life and career
Vindhya was born on 12 August 1980. She made her cinematic debut with Sangamam (1999)  alongside Rahman, though  the film won positive reviews, it performed below average at the box office. Towards the latter end of her career, she appeared in low-budget films. Vayasu Pasanga is one of her box office hits. Vindhya married Gopalakrishnan, actress Bhanupriya's brother, in an arranged marriage on 16 February 2008 at the Guruvayur Temple. She filed for a divorce in 2012.

Political career

In April 2006, Vindhya joined the AIADMK in the presence of Then Party General Secretary Jayalalithaa and campaigned for 2006 Tamil Nadu assembly election. Vindhya campaigned against the DMK party during the 2011, 2016 state assembly elections, 2014 loksabha election and was instrumental in the defeat of that party. She was the staunch loyalist of Former chief minister of Tamil Nadu and AIADMK Supremo J. Jayalalithaa. 

Vindhya used to present the basketful of mangoes from her chandragiri garden to Jayalalithaa during her yearly summer visit to later's poes garden residence from 2012 to 2016. Jayalalithaa used to praise Vindhya for those delicious mangoes. Even after Jayalalithaa's death, She continued offering the mango baskets at Jayalalithaa's memorial and distributed it to the locals at Marina Beach.

After Jayalalithaa's demise in 2016, Vindhya stayed away from active politics. On 20 February 2018, Vindhya again came to prominence when she wrote a letter to then Tamil Nadu Chief Minister Edappadi K. Palaniswami on his completion of 1 year in office. Ahead of 2019 loksabha election, She made a comeback as a star campaigner of the party. In July 2020, She was appointed as the deputy propaganda secretary of AIADMK Party. She campaigned for the party in 2021 Assembly Election.

Filmography

References

External links 
 
 Vindhya on Twitter
 Vindhya on Facebook

All India Anna Dravida Munnetra Kazhagam politicians
Indian politicians
21st-century Indian women politicians
21st-century Indian politicians
Tamil Nadu politicians
Women in Tamil Nadu politics
Indian film actresses
Actresses in Tamil cinema
1980 births
Living people
People from Coimbatore
Actresses from Tamil Nadu
Actresses in Telugu cinema
Actresses in Malayalam cinema
21st-century Indian actresses